Behsūd is a town in Maidan Wardak province in central Afghanistan. It is the administrative center of Markazi Bihsud District.

The town of Behsud has a population of 4,619.

In the Maidan Wardak province, there are two neighboring districts in the northwest which are called Behsud.

Geography and climate

In the Maidan Wardak province, there are two neighboring districts in the northwest which are called Behsud.
 Behsood is usually spelt as Behsud or Bihsud and sometimes Bihsood or Besud.
 The two districts are called:  Markazi Behsud (Central Behsud or Behsud 2) and Hisa-I-Awail Behsud (Behsud 1).

The two districts of Behsud are the followings
 Behsud 1 has 520 villages, with the estimated population of 5,817 families of 56,129 persons; its Distract Governor is Mr. Baqeer Noor
 Behsud 2 has 920 villages and sub-villages with the estimated population of 113,295 individuals; its Distract Governor is Mr. Mahram Ali Fahimi.
It is also worth mentioning that, both Behsud's governors are closely associated with Hizb-e-Wahdat (Mohammad Karim Khalili).

Climate
Behsud is located in the country's central highlands which experiences long and extremely harsh winter. It is classified in the Köppen climate classification as a warm-summer humid continental climate (Köppen climate classification: Dsb).

Demographics
A majority of the population are Hazaras with Kuchis or Pashtun nomads. The area has been a site of Kuchi-Hazara conflict.

Maidan Wardak is a mountainous province which contains a diverse population. Hazaras are occupying the northern and western while Durrani Pashutans and Ghilzai are inhabiting the southern part of the province.

The ethnic composition of Behsud is mostly Hazaras. Both districts have 95% of Hazaras and 18 different tribes who get elected as leaders of Shura.

The Conflict Between Hazara's and Kochi's in Behsud 
The battle between Hazaras and Kuchis in Wardak province dates back to Abdur Rahman Khan's dictatorship at the close of the nineteenth century, and the state's policy of securing control of Afghanistan's Hazara-dominated central provinces (Hazarajat).

Before Abdur Rahman took control of Afghanistan, the Hazara people in the country's central regions were reasonably self-sufficient. Many Hazaras were slaughtered or forced to flee the area under his reign, while Kuchis aligned with Abdur Rahaman were granted grazing rights in the area.

The Hazaras were later permitted to return to these lands under Habibullah Khan's administration, for a variety of reasons, one of which being that the Kochis, who had previously been granted permission to utilize the land, notified the authorities that they were unable to cultivate it. As a result, Kochi's rights were taken away by the PDPA rule, but they were reestablished by the Taliban regime.

Since 2007, the conflict between these two groups has intensified, with periodic violent attacks, particularly in the two districts of Behsud, Maidan Wardak province. In the years 2007, 2008, and 2010, around ten persons were killed, according to reports. Furthermore, significant material damage and numerous thefts have been observed. It's also worth noting that according to a UNHCR email from 2010, more than 1800 households were forced to leave the region in May 2010.

References

Populated places in Maidan Wardak Province
Hazarajat